Augusta Bertha Wagner (May 19, 1895 – February 4, 1976) was an American missionary educator in China, and a headmistress of the Shipley School.

Early life 
Augusta "Gussie" Wagner was born in New York City, and grew up in the city's Yorkville neighborhood. She was a member of the Madison Avenue Presbyterian Church and friend of its pastor, Henry Sloane Coffin. She earned a bachelor's degree at Wellesley College in 1924, and completed doctoral studies in economics at Columbia University.

Career 
Wagner briefly served on the YWCA board after college. She taught economics at Yenching University in Beijing, from 1926 until 1942. While teaching at Yenching, Wagner wrote Labor Legislation in China (1938), based on her doctoral dissertation. After Pearl Harbor, she was held in a Japanese internment camp in Weihsien, then returned to the United States in 1943. In 1944 and 1945, she worked in Washington, D.C. at the State Department.

Wagner was associate headmistress at the Shipley School, alongside her partner, Margaret Bailey Speer, from 1945 to 1960. She also spoke at Bryn Mawr College and at church and women's groups about her experiences and economic conditions in China.

Personal life 
Wagner lived, worked, and traveled with fellow American teacher Margaret Bailey Speer, in China and in the United States, from the 1930s into the 1970s. In 1968, Speer and Wagner were honored by the Yenching Alumni club with a supper in Honolulu. Wagner died in 1976, aged 80 years.

References 

1895 births
1976 deaths
People from Bryn Mawr, Pennsylvania
Wellesley College alumni
American women educators
Academic staff of Yenching University
American women civilians in World War II
American women economists
People from Yorkville, Manhattan
20th-century Presbyterians
Presbyterians from New York (state)
Columbia Graduate School of Arts and Sciences alumni
Educators from New York City